Timberneck is a historic home located near Wicomico, Gloucester County, Virginia.  It was built about 1810, and is a two-story, three bay, gable roofed frame dwelling in the Georgian style. The main house was enlarged by the addition of a frame wing in the mid-19th century.

It was added to the National Register of Historic Places in 1979.

References

Houses on the National Register of Historic Places in Virginia
Georgian architecture in Virginia
Houses completed in 1810
Houses in Gloucester County, Virginia
National Register of Historic Places in Gloucester County, Virginia